Sulfur hexafluoride or sulphur hexafluoride (British spelling) is an inorganic compound with the formula SF6. It is a colorless, odorless, non-flammable, and non-toxic gas.  has an octahedral geometry, consisting of six fluorine atoms attached to a central sulfur atom.  It is a hypervalent molecule.

Typical for a nonpolar gas,  is poorly soluble in water but quite soluble in nonpolar organic solvents. It has a density of 6.12 g/L at sea level conditions, considerably higher than the density of air (1.225 g/L). It is generally transported as a liquefied compressed gas.

Its concentration in Earth's troposphere reached 10.63 parts per trillion (ppt) in 2021, rising at 0.39 ppt/year. The increase over the prior 40 years was driven in large part by the expanding electric power sector, including fugitive emissions from banks of  gas contained in its medium- and high-voltage switchgear. Uses in magnesium, aluminium, and electronics manufacturing also hastened atmospheric growth.

Synthesis and reactions

Sulfur hexafluoride on Earth exists primarily as a man-made industrial gas, but has also been found to occur naturally.

This was also the method used by the discoverers Henri Moissan and Paul Lebeau in 1901. Some other sulfur fluorides are cogenerated, but these are removed by heating the mixture to disproportionate any  (which is highly toxic) and then scrubbing the product with NaOH to destroy remaining .

Alternatively, utilizing bromine, sulfur hexafluoride can be synthesized from SF4 and CoF3 at lower temperatures (e.g. 100 °C), as follows:

A main contribution to the inertness of SF6 is the steric hindrance of the sulfur atom, whereas its heavier group 16 counterparts, such as SeF6 are more reactive than SF6 as a result of less steric hindrance (See hydrolysis example). It does not react with molten sodium below its boiling point, but reacts exothermically with lithium.

Applications
The electrical power industry used about 80% of the sulfur hexafluoride produced in 2000, mostly as a gaseous dielectric medium. Other main uses as of 2015 included a silicon etchant for semiconductor manufacturing, and an inert gas for the casting of magnesium.

Dielectric medium
  is used in the electrical industry as a gaseous dielectric medium for high-voltage sulfur hexafluoride circuit breakers, switchgear, and other electrical equipment, often replacing oil-filled circuit breakers (OCBs) that can contain harmful polychlorinated biphenyls (PCBs).  gas under pressure is used as an insulator in gas insulated switchgear (GIS) because it has a much higher dielectric strength than air or dry nitrogen. The high dielectric strength is a result of the gas's high electronegativity and density. This property makes it possible to significantly reduce the size of electrical gear. This makes GIS more suitable for certain purposes such as indoor placement, as opposed to air-insulated electrical gear, which takes up considerably more room.

Gas-insulated electrical gear is also more resistant to the effects of pollution and climate, as well as being more reliable in long-term operation because of its controlled operating environment. Exposure to an arc chemically breaks down  though most of the decomposition products tend to quickly re-form , a process termed "self-healing". Arcing or corona can produce disulfur decafluoride, a highly toxic gas, with toxicity similar to phosgene.  was considered a potential chemical warfare agent in World War II because it does not produce lacrimation or skin irritation, thus providing little warning of exposure.

 is also commonly encountered as a high voltage dielectric in the high voltage supplies of particle accelerators, such as Van de Graaff generators and Pelletrons and high voltage transmission electron microscopes.

Compact GIS technology that combines vacuum switching with clean air insulation has been introduced for a subset of applications up to 420 kV.

Medical use
 is used to provide a tamponade or plug of a retinal hole in retinal detachment repair operations in the form of a gas bubble. It is inert in the vitreous chamber. The bubble initially doubles its volume in 36 hours due to oxygen and nitrogen entering it, before being absorbed in the blood in 10–14 days.

 is used as a contrast agent for ultrasound imaging. Sulfur hexafluoride microbubbles are administered in solution through injection into a peripheral vein. These microbubbles enhance the visibility of blood vessels to ultrasound. This application has been used to examine the vascularity of tumours. It remains visible in the blood for 3 to 8 minutes, and is exhaled by the lungs.

Tracer compound
Sulfur hexafluoride was the tracer gas used in the first roadway air dispersion model calibration; this research program was sponsored by the U.S. Environmental Protection Agency and conducted in Sunnyvale, California on U.S. Highway 101. Gaseous  is used as a tracer gas in short-term experiments of ventilation efficiency in buildings and indoor enclosures, and for determining infiltration rates.

Sulfur hexafluoride was used as a non-toxic test gas in an experiment at St John's Wood tube station in London, United Kingdom on 25 March 2007. The gas was released throughout the station, and monitored as it drifted around. The purpose of the experiment, which had been announced earlier in March by the Secretary of State for Transport Douglas Alexander, was to investigate how toxic gas might spread throughout London Underground stations and buildings during a terrorist attack.

Sulfur hexafluoride is also routinely used as a tracer gas in laboratory fume hood containment testing. The gas is used in the final stage of ASHRAE 110 fume hood qualification.  A plume of gas is generated inside of the fume hood and a battery of tests are performed while a gas analyzer arranged outside of the hood samples for SF6 to verify the containment properties of the fume hood.

It has been used successfully as a tracer in oceanography to study diapycnal mixing and air-sea gas exchange.

Other uses
 The magnesium industry uses  as an inert "cover gas" to prevent oxidation during casting. Once the largest user, consumption has declined greatly with capture and recycling.
 Insulated glazing windows have used it as a filler to improve their thermal and acoustic insulation performance.
  plasma is used in the semiconductor industry as an etchant in processes such as deep reactive-ion etching. A small fraction of the  breaks down in the plasma into sulfur and fluorine, with the fluorine ions performing a chemical reaction with silicon. 
 Tires filled with it take longer to deflate from diffusion through rubber due to the larger molecule size.
 Nike likewise used it to obtain a patent and to fill the cushion bags in all of their "Air"-branded shoes from 1992 to 2006.  277 tons was used during the peak in 1997. 
 The United States Navy's Mark 50 torpedo closed Rankine-cycle propulsion system is powered by sulfur hexafluoride in an exothermic reaction with solid lithium.
 Waveguides in high-power microwave systems are pressurized with it. The gas electrically insulates the waveguide, preventing internal arcing.
 Electrostatic loudspeakers have used it because of its high dielectric strength and high molecular weight.
 The chemical weapon disulfur decafluoride is produced with it as a feedstock.
 For entertainment purposes, when breathed,  causes the voice to become significantly deeper, due to its density being so much higher than air. This phenomenon is related to the more well-known effect of breathing low-density helium, which causes someone's voice to become much higher. Both of these effects should only be attempted with caution as these gases displace oxygen that the lungs are attempting to extract from the air. Sulfur hexafluoride is also mildly anesthetic.
 For science demonstrations / magic as "invisible water" since a light foil boat can be floated in a tank, as will an air-filled balloon.
It is used for benchmark and calibration measurements in Associative and Dissociative Electron Attachment (DEA) experiments

Greenhouse gas

According to the Intergovernmental Panel on Climate Change,  is the most potent greenhouse gas.  Its global warming potential of 23,900 times that of  when compared over a 100-year period. Sulfur hexafluoride is inert in the troposphere and stratosphere and is extremely long-lived, with an estimated atmospheric lifetime of 800–3,200 years.

Measurements of SF6 show that its global average mixing ratio has increased from a steady base of about 54 parts per quadrillion prior to industrialization, to over 11 parts per trillion (ppt) as of June 2022, and is increasing by about 0.4 ppt (3.5 percent) per year. Average global SF6 concentrations increased by about seven percent per year during the 1980s and 1990s, mostly as the result of its use in magnesium production, and by electrical utilities and electronics manufacturers. Given the small amounts of SF6 released compared to carbon dioxide, its overall individual contribution to global warming is estimated to be less than 0.2 percent, however the collective contribution of it and similar man-made halogenated gases has reached about 10 percent as of 2020.  Alternatives are being tested.

In Europe,  falls under the F-Gas directive which ban or control its use for several applications. Since 1 January 2006,  is banned as a tracer gas and in all applications except high-voltage switchgear. This was done by comparing purchases with inventory, assuming the difference was leaked, then locating and fixing the leaks.

Physiological effects and precautions
Sulfur hexafluoride is a nontoxic gas, but by displacing oxygen in the lungs, it also carries the risk of asphyxia if too much is inhaled. Since it is more dense than air, a substantial quantity of gas, when released, will settle in low-lying areas and present a significant risk of asphyxiation if the area is entered. That is particularly relevant to its use as an insulator in electrical equipment since workers may be in trenches or pits below equipment containing .

As with all gases, the density of  affects the resonance frequencies of the vocal tract, thus changing drastically the vocal sound qualities, or timbre, of those who inhale it. It does not affect the vibrations of the vocal folds. The density of sulfur hexafluoride is relatively high at room temperature and pressure due to the gas's large molar mass. Unlike helium, which has a molar mass of about 4 g/mol and pitches the voice up,  has a molar mass of about 146 g/mol, and the speed of sound through the gas is about 134 m/s at room temperature, pitching the voice down. For comparison, the molar mass of air, which is about 80% nitrogen and 20% oxygen, is approximately 30 g/mol which leads to a speed of sound of 343 m/s.

Sulfur hexafluoride has an anesthetic potency slightly lower than nitrous oxide; it is classified as a mild anesthetic.

See also
 Selenium hexafluoride
 Tellurium hexafluoride
 Uranium hexafluoride
 Hypervalent molecule
 Halocarbon—another group of major greenhouse gases
 Trifluoromethylsulfur pentafluoride, a similar gas

References

Further reading
 
 
 
 
 
 SF6 Reduction Partnership for Electric Power Systems

External links
 Fluoride and compounds fact sheet— National Pollutant Inventory
 High GWP Gases and Climate Change from the U.S. EPA website
 International Conference on SF6 and the Environment (related archive)
 CDC - NIOSH Pocket Guide to Chemical Hazards

Sulfur fluorides
Dielectric gases
Greenhouse gases
Octahedral compounds
Hexafluorides
Industrial gases
Refrigerants
Hypervalent molecules
General anesthetics
Ultrasound contrast agents